Covenant Health is the name of several healthcare provider organizations, including:

Covenant Health (Alberta), a large Catholic health care organization in Alberta, Canada
Covenant HealthCare, based in Saginaw, Michigan
Covenant Health System in the Lubbock, Texas, metropolitan area
Covenant Health Systems in New England
Covenant Health (Tennessee) in the Knoxville metropolitan area

See also
 Covenant (disambiguation)